P Vijay Kumar was an Indian football player who also represented the country at the international level.

Born and brought up in Jamshedpur,  he originally hailed from Andhra Pradesh. 
Kumar joined Tata Steel in 1977.
The former international player has been a pillar of strength when it comes to the Tata Football Academy (TFA).

He was part of the national squad in the SAF Games in Calcutta in 1987, besides turning out in three Nehru Cup matches (1987–89) in Calicut, Calcutta and Siliguri.
Kumar scored in an exhibition match against Bochum team of West Germany at Jamshedpur in 1986.
He also played for the country in the Asia Cup (Singapore) in 1988.

Coaching
Kumar has cleared the Asian Football Confederation (AFC) A Licence coaching course, making him eligible to coach in the national soccer circuit.

Kumar has cleared the exam conducted by All India Football Federation for coaches hired in professional clubs.
He cleared the C and B Licence courses in 1997 and 2006, respectively.

Death
Kumar died 19 November 2015.

References

1958 births
2015 deaths
Indian footballers
Footballers from Jharkhand
People from Jamshedpur
Association footballers not categorized by position